The Restoration of Pre-War Practices Act 1919 was a British Act of Parliament passed on 2 June 1919, which gave soldiers returning from World War I their pre-war jobs back.

The Restoration of Pre-War Practices (no. 3) Bill (UK) had its second reading in Parliament on 2 June 1919. The Minister of Labour, Sir Robert Horne described it as "designed to ensure to the trade unions of the country the right to have restored certain trade union customs and practices which they gave up during the War in order to bring about the greatest possible production of war material."

One of the consequences of the Act was that women were no longer eligible to work in many of the roles they were employed to fill during the war. By 1920, a million fewer women were in employment. The act caused over 25 percent of working women to return from factories to domestic service as they were dismissed to make way for returning soldiers, whilst others established societies to support women to stay in the careers they had entered during the war. The Act gave employers up to two months to return to pre-war practices and then required them to be maintained for at least a year. The removal of women from employment combined with the economic downturn of late 1920 reinforced employer and trade union hostility to their return.

See also
History of women in engineering in the United Kingdom

References 

United Kingdom Acts of Parliament 1919
1919 in law
Women in the United Kingdom